Hickory Grove Baptist Church is a Baptist church in Charlotte, North Carolina. It is affiliated with the Southern Baptist Convention. It is pastored by Rev. Clint Pressley. Hickory Grove Baptist Church has three campus locations in the Charlotte area.

History 
Hickory Grove Baptist Church was established in an unused dairy barn in 1955 with a vision to reach the people in the Hickory Grove community in east Charlotte. The church inaugurated a new building in 1966.

This vision grew as Hickory Grove started a satellite location in northern Mecklenburg County in 1995. As of August, 2009 the church has grown to over 18,000 members and is the second largest Baptist church in North Carolina. The north campus, located in the Concord Mills area, is located at 13200 Mallard Creek Road,  Charlotte, NC, 28262.

Future 
On January 30, 2011, The congregation of Hickory Grove Baptist Church affirmed the Rev. Clint Pressley as the new Senior Pastor of Hickory Grove. Rev. Pressley actually attended the church as a teenager, and was a pastor at Hickory Grove, under Dr. Joe B. Brown, before leaving to serve at Alabama's Dauphin Way Baptist Church. Rev. Pressley returned to replace Dr. Joe B. Brown as Senior Pastor, in 2009.

References

External links
 My Hickory Grove
 Hickory Grove Worship - Live and On Demand Video and Audio
 Hickory Grove Christian School
 Sunday School

Baptist churches in North Carolina
Evangelical churches in the United States
Churches in North Carolina
Southern Baptist Convention churches
Christian organizations established in 1955
Churches in Charlotte, North Carolina
1955 establishments in North Carolina